The 2019–20 season was the club's 100th season in existence. East Bengal FC formed in 1920, played its centenary season, competing in the I-League, Durand Cup and Calcutta Football League.

Pre-season overview
East Bengal FC already announced the extension of the contract for 2 more years of their coach Alejandro Menéndez  before the last game of the season. They also announced the extension of the contract of their Physical trainer and assistant coach Carlos Nodar Paz  for 2 more years. 

East Bengal FC made the announcement of retaining core players of the 2018-19 I-League campaign for the next season starting with Brandon Vanlalremdika, Lalrindika Ralte, Borja Gomez and Samad Ali Mallick. East Bengal FC also announced the signing of Naorem Tondomba Singh  from NEROCA F.C. for a 4 years deal and Boithang Haokip  from 2018-19 Indian Super League champions Bengaluru F.C. on a 3-year deal.

On 6 June, East Bengal FC announced the double signing of Pintu Mahato and Abhishek Ambekar from their arch-rivals Mohun Bagan on a 3 years and 2 years deal respectively. The duo would strengthen the squad for the upcoming season. East Bengal FC also announced the contract extension of star central defensive midfielder Kassim Aidara for another season, after a stellar performance in the I-League last season gaining coach Alejandro Menéndez's trust.

On 8 June, controversy related to Jobby Justin newly emerged after the transfer saga to ATK was questionable and the AIFF passed the incident to the IFA disciplinary committee for their decision. The IFA after reviewing the documents announced that Jobby Justin has to play for East Bengal FC for the upcoming season to AIFF and now it is up to the AIFF to decide on the final fate of the last year's top scorer for East Bengal FC. However, the AIFF Players' status committee announced that Jobby Justin is free to play for ATK.

On 12 June, East Bengal FC announced the contract extension of attacking midfield Jaime Santos Colado for 2 more years. The 24-year-old Spanish attacker scored 5 goals including a goal in the Kolkata Derby last season. On 13 June, East Bengal FC announced that UEFA pro-licensed former FC Barcelona Escola Technical Director Josep Ferré, popularly known as Coco, has joined as the Assistant Coach for the team until 2021. The very next day, East Bengal FC announced that former I-League winner with Bengaluru F.C., Goal-keeper Lalthuammawia Ralte has joined in the ranks on loan till the end of the season from ISL side FC Goa.

On 26 June, East Bengal FC announced that assistant coach Bastob Roy will continue for the 2019–20 season and will also be the head of Youth Development. East Bengal FC also announced that Abhra Mondal would continue as the goalkeeper coach for the 2019–20 season. On 3 July, East Bengal FC announced the signing of their 4th foreigner, Marti Crespi who played for Delhi Dynamos F.C. in the 2018-19 Indian Super League season. East Bengal FC also called in two young promising players, who recently impressed in the 2018–19 Goa Professional League, 23-year-old Salgaocar F.C. forward Ronaldo Oliveira, who became the top scorer with 23 goals and SESA FA defender Anil Chavan, to join the trails and if they can impress coach Alejandro Menéndez, they will be signed.

On 14 July, East Bengal FC announced that promising defender Asheer Akhtar will join in for trials from Bengaluru FC. He was adjudged the "Upcoming Player of the season" by Bengaluru FC in 2017–18. On 20 July, East Bengal FC announced the signing of Abhijit Sarkar on a season-long loan from ISL side Chennaiyin FC. Abhijit represented India in the 2017 FIFA U-17 World Cup, and also played for Indian Arrows in the 2018-19 I-League.

On 4 August, East Bengal FC confirmed that Goanese forward Ronaldo Oliveira has signed for the club on a 3 years contract after impressing the coaching staff in the trials.

On 6 August, East Bengal FC announced the singing of their 5th foreigner Marcos Jiménez from CD Atlético Baleares, who plays as a forward.

On 23 August, East Bengal FC completed their quota of foreigners as they announced the signing of Juan Mera Gonzalez from SD Leioa, who can play as a left-winger as well as attacking midfielder.

Transfers

Incoming

Outgoing

New contracts

Promoted from academy

Team

First-team squad

{|class="wikitable" style="text-align:center; font-size:90%; width:80%;"
|-
! style="background:#f00; color:#ff0; text-align:center;"|No.
! style="background:#f00; color:#ff0; text-align:center;"|Name
! style="background:#f00; color:#ff0; text-align:center;"|Nationality
! style="background:#f00; color:#ff0; text-align:center;"|Position
! style="background:#f00; color:#ff0; text-align:center;"|Date of Birth (Age)
|-
! colspan="5" style="background:#ff0; color:#f00; text-align:center;"|Goalkeepers
|-
|1
|Lalthuammawia Ralte
|
|GK
|
|-
|32
|Mirshad Michu
|
|GK
|
|-
|40
|Rakshit Dagar
|
|GK
|
|-
! colspan="5" style="background:#f00; color:#ff0; text-align:center;"|Defenders
|-
|2
|Asheer Akhtar
|
|CB/RB
|
|-
|4
|Jhonny Acosta
|
|CB
|
|-
|5
|Kamalpreet Singh
|
|RB
|
|-
|6
|Gurwinder Singh
|
|CB
|
|-
|15
|Abhash Thapa
|
|LB
|
|-
|25
|Samad Ali Mallick
|
|RB
|
|-
|27
|Abhishek Ambekar
|
|LB
|
|-
|28
|Monotosh Chakladar
|
|CB/LB
|
|-
|29
|Mehtab Singh
|
|CB/RB
|
|-
|41
|Manoj Mohammed
|
|LB
|
|-
! colspan="5" style="background:#ff0; color:#f00; text-align:center;"|Midfielders
|-
|7
|Abhijit Sarkar
|
|CAM/RW
|
|-
|8
|Jaime Santos Colado
|
|RW/LW
|
|-
|9
|Boithang Haokip
|
|CAM/LW/RW
|
|-
|11
|Pintu Mahato
|
|LW/RW
|
|-
|14
|Naorem Tondomba Singh
|
|CM
|
|-
|16
|Kassim Aidara
|
|CDM
|
|-
|20
|Lalrindika Ralte
|
|CM
|
|-
|23
|Juan Mera González
|
|LW/CAM
|
|-
|24
|Víctor Pérez Alonso
|
|CDM
|
|-
|30
|Brandon Vanlalremdika
|
|LW
|
|-
|38
|Prakash Sarkar
|
|CDM/RB
|
|-
|43
|PC Rohlupuia
|
|CAM
|
|-
! colspan="5" style="background:#f00; color:#ff0; text-align:center;"|Forwards
|-
|17
|Edmund Lalrindika
|
|LW/RW
|
|-
|18
|Marcos de la Espada
|
|FW
|
|-
|26
|Bidyashagar Singh
|
|FW
|
|-

Technical staff

Kit
Supplier: Kaizen Sports  Sponsors:  Quess Corp  Co-Sponsor: Paragon; Mio Amore
East Bengal FC launched its special Centenary year kit on 27 July 2019, as a tribute to the oldest kit found, and worn by the team in 1925–26.

Season overview

August 
East Bengal FC started their campaign for the season on 3 August against Army Red in the 2019 Durand Cup at the East Bengal Ground and won by 2–0, with goals from Jaime Santos Colado scoring from a freekick in the 85th minute and Bidyashagar Singh tapping home from a Samad Ali Mallick cross in the 91st minute. East Bengal FC played Jamshedpur FC (R) on 6th at the East Bengal Ground in the next match in the 2019 Durand Cup and won by a convincing 6–0 margin, with Jaime Santos Colado and Bidyashagar Singh each scoring a brace and other two scored by Pintu Mahata and Boithang Haokip. Jaime Santos suffered an injury to his shoulder early in the first half and was taken off to avoid any risk.
East Bengal FC started off their 2019-20 Calcutta Premier Division campaign on 9 August against George Telegraph S.C. at the East Bengal Ground, however, they faced a set-back as the Red and Gold brigade lost by a solitary goal scored by Justice Morgan in the dying minutes of the injury time. East Bengal FC fielded a rather weakened side, with 5 academy players in the starting eleven and just Martí Crespí in the lineup.

East Bengal FC faced Bengaluru FC next in the 2019 Durand Cup final Group A match on 14 August at the Salt Lake Stadium to secure a spot in the Semi-Finals. The visitors went ahead early in the game with an opportunistic strike from striker Ajay Chhetri. The Red and Gold brigade, however, rallied from behind in the second half with a brace from their academy graduate Bidyashagar Singh to win it 2–1 and top the group stages and enter the semi-finals.

East Bengal FC were supposed to face BSS Sporting Club in the 2019-20 Calcutta Premier Division on 17 August however, the match was postponed since the Red and Gold brigade will be playing in the 2019 Durand Cup Semi-Final on 21 August, against the winners of Group D at the Salt Lake Stadium.

East Bengal FC faced Gokulam Kerala F.C. in the Semi-Finals of the 2019 Durand Cup and lost in the Penalty Shootouts by a 2–3 margin after the game ended 1–1 after 120 minutes. Samad Ali Mallick scored the first goal for the Red and Gold brigade, however, Marcus Joseph made no mistakes as he equalized for the visiting side in the dying minutes of the match after Mehtab Singh conceded a penalty by pulling down Henry Kisekka, resulting in the former being sent-off. 10 men East Bengal FC took the match to the tie-breakers but Lalrindika Ralte, Jaime Santos Colado and Naorem Tondomba Singh missed from the spot as Gokulam Kerala F.C. progressed into the final.

East Bengal FC faced BSS Sporting Club in the next match on 25 August in the 2019–20 CFL at the East Bengal Ground and won it by 2–1 margin with goals from Jaime Santos Colado and academy graduate Bidyashagar Singh. William Opoku reduced the margin in the dying minutes from a penalty which was conceded as the ball struck Kamalpreet Singh's hand inside the box. Spanish striker Marcos de la Espada debuted in the match for the Red and Gold brigade and in the muddly playing conditions had a decent first outing.

East Bengal FC played Aryan F.C. next on 28 August in the Calcutta Football League at the East Bengal Ground and won quite handsomely by a 3–0 margin with Lalrindika Ralte opening the scoring in the 40th minute and Jaime Santos Colado netting a brace in the second half. The Red and Gold brigade would have had a huge scoreline if not for the missed chances in the second half from Bidyashagar Singh, Samad Ali Mallick, Ronaldo Oliviera.

September
East Bengal FC faced their arch-rivals Mohun Bagan next on 1 September at the Salt Lake Stadium in the first Kolkata Derby of the season. Coach Alejandro Menendez benched two top scorers Jaime Santos Colado and Bidyashagar Singh for the match, which ended in a goalless stalemate with both teams failing to break open the deadlock.

East Bengal FC faced Southern Samity in the next match of the 2019–20 CFL on 5 September at the East Bengal Ground and in a difficult underfoot conditions, emerged victorious by a 2–1 margin, with goals from academy graduate Bidyashagar Singh and star-man Jaime Santos Colado, both scoring their 7th goal of the season. Arjun Tudu reduced the margin for the visiting side but the Red and Gold brigade held onto the lead. East Bengal now has 10 points from 5 matches in the Calcutta Football League.

East Bengal FC faced Peerless SC in the next match of the 2019–20 CFL on 9 September at the East Bengal Ground and in a very hard-fought match, lost 0–1 courtesy of a penalty goal from Ansumana Kromah in the 65th minute. Marcos de la Espada's header hit the goalpost in the first half while Brandon Vanlalremdika and substitute Jaime Santos Colado failed to convert their chances as the Red and Gold brigade failed to take any point from the game.

East Bengal FC players and support staff were penalised by the IFA governing body for the after-match incident with the match referee. Captain Lalrindika Ralte and Mehtab Singh were both handed a match ban and 1 lakh Rupees fine, while team manager Debraj Chowdhury and goalkeeper coach Abhra Mondal were handed a year-long ban from all IFA competitions.

East Bengal FC faced Kalighat MS in the next match of the 2019–20 CFL on 12 September at the East Bengal Ground. After conceding a goal early in the 27th minute against the run of play, the Red and Gold brigade rallied from behind to score 3 goals, with Bidyashagar Singh equalizing in the first half then Pintu Mahata's shot deflected into the net off Lassine and then Jaime Santos Colado increasing the lead. Kalighat MS reduced the margin in the 82nd min to make the scoreline 3–2 but East Bengal team was fast to react as Jaime Santos scored again within a minute to take full 3 points from the match. East Bengal now stands 3rd in the table with 13 points of 7 matches.

East Bengal FC appealed to the IFA for the suspension of Manager and Goalkeeper coach and IFA has reduced the penalty of the duo as well as for the players. Manager Debraj Chowdhury and Goal Keeper coach Abhra Mondal are now just fined 75 thousand and their suspension is lifted, players  Lalrindika Ralte and Mehtab Singh's fines are also reduced to 75 thousand from 1 lakh Rupees.

East Bengal FC faced Bhawanipore F.C. in the next match of the 2019–20 CFL on 16 September at the Kalyani Stadium and in a tense game, the Red and Gold brigade twice went ahead, however, both times nullified by Bhawanipur to end 2–2. Pintu Mahata scored the opener early in the 7th minute to take a 1–0 advantage at HT. Kamo Stephane Bayi equalised for the visitors. Borja Gomez Perez again put East Bengal ahead in the 83rd min however again Jagannath Sana equalised just a minute later.

East Bengal FC faced NBP Rainbow AC in the next match of the 2019–20 CFL on 20 September at the East Bengal Ground and managed to edge past by a solitary goal by Marcos de la Espada from the penalty spot in the 35th minute. Samad Ali Mallick was adjudged the Man of the Match for his brilliant display down the right-wing.

East Bengal FC faced their rivals Mohammedan Sporting in the next match of the 2019–20 CFL on 26 September at the Salt Lake Stadium and in a potential title decided the Red and Gold brigade edged past the Black Panthers by 3–2 scoreline. East Bengal took the lead early as Pintu Mahata headed home brilliantly from a cross from Kamalpreet Singh in the 12th minute. Mohammedan Sporting was quick to react as they equalised in the 23rd min as Borja Gomez Perez deflected the ball into his own net from a setpiece movement. In the 43rd min, East Bengal won a penalty after Shaiful Rahman stopped the ball with his hand as it was going into the goal, hence getting a red card in the process; Jaime Santos Colado did no mistake in scoring from the spot to take a 2–1 lead at HT. East Bengal increased the lead in the second half as Marcos de la Espada tapped in from close range from a Lalrindika Ralte cross to make it 3–1. The men in Black and White did surge for a comeback with 10 men as they reduced the margin in the 83rd min as Arthur Kouassi scored. However, East Bengal held onto the lead and kept their title hopes alive with 20 points from 10 matches with a game to go.

East Bengal FC was supposed to face Calcutta Customs in the last match of the 2019–20 CFL on 29 September at the East Bengal Ground however the match was abandoned due to unplayable conditions due to heavy rainfall, which caused water-clogging inside the playing arena. The match was rescheduled on 3 October at the Kalyani Stadium however East Bengal FC did not show up and Customs were given a Walkover.

November
East Bengal FC had their pre-season for the 2019-20 I-League in October, after they withdrew from the 2019 Sheikh Kamal International Club Cup. The Red and Gold brigade decided to play a set of pre-season friendlies against ISL sides before the start of the I-League. East Bengal FC played a friendly against 2018-19 Indian Super League Champions Bengaluru FC on 6 November at Bengaluru which ended 1–1. Marcos de la Espada opened the scoring early in the 4th minute, however, Edmund Lalrindika equalized for the home side from a long-range effort early in the second half to end the game in a stalemate.

East Bengal FC played their second pre-season friendly against another ISL opponent, NorthEast United FC on 16 November, at Indira Gandhi Athletic Stadium in Guwahati which ended in a goalless draw.

East Bengal FC played their third and final pre-season friendly against Indian Super League side Jamshedpur FC on 21 November, at the JFC Training Ground in Jamshedpur where they defeated the ISL team by 2–0 courtesy of goals from Abhijit Sarkar and Jaime Santos Colado to end their pre-season campaign before the start of the 2019-20 I-League.

December

East Bengal FC began their 2019-20 I-League campaign against Real Kashmir F.C. on 4 December at the Kalyani Stadium. The match ended up 1–1 draw. Marcos de la Espada scored on behalf of East Bengal, and Juan Mera Gonzalez became Hero of the match.

East Bengal FC travelled to Ludhiana to face-off with Punjab FC on 7 December for their second match of the campaign and failed to win again as the match ended 1–1 draw. Juan Mera González scored the equaliser in the 85th min to avoid the defeat.

East Bengal FC travelled to Imphal for their third match of the 2019-20 I-League as they faced NEROCA F.C. on 10 December. The Red and Gold brigade managed to grab their first win of the campaign as the match ended 4–1 in favour of East Bengal. Jaime Santos Colado scored a brace while Juan Mera González and Marcos de la Espada scored the other two.

East Bengal FC faced TRAU F.C. next on 14 December at the Kalyani Stadium and in a close game, managed to grab all 3 points as the Red and Golds won 2–1 with goals from Marcos de la Espada in the 17th minute and Marti Crespi in the 89th minute. Deepak Devrani had equalized for the away side in the 45th minute.

East Bengal FC were supposed face their arch-rivals Mohun Bagan in the first Kolkata Derby of the 2019-20 I-League next on 22 December at the Salt Lake Stadium however the match was postponed citing security concerns by the police and home team Mohun Bagan.

January
East Bengal FC will faced Churchill Brothers away on 4 January at the Fatorda Stadium and lost courtesy of a solitary goal in the 89th minute from Willis Plaza. This was the first defeat of the campaign for the Red and Gold brigade.

On 8 January, East Bengal F.C. announced the signing of Abhash Thapa on loan from ISL side Hyderabad FC for the remainder of the season.

On 14 January, East Bengal F.C. announced their second winter transfer signing as they hired Bengaluru F.C. attacking midfielder Edmund Lalrindika on loan for the rest of the season.

East Bengal FC faced Gokulam Kerala F.C. at home on 15 January at the Kalyani Stadium and suffered their second defeat of the 2019-20 I-League campaign as they lost 3–1 to the Malabarians. Henry Kisekka, Marcus Joseph scored two while Marti Crespi scored an own goal as the visitors won the game. Kassim Aidara scored the only goal for the Red and Golds.

East Bengal FC faced arch-rivals Mohun Bagan on 19 January at the Salt Lake Stadium in the Kolkata Derby and faced their third defeat in a row as the Green and Maroons snatched a hard-fought 2–1  victory over the Red and Gold brigade. Joseba Beitia opened the scoring for the Mariners in the 18th minute. Baba Diawara increased the lead in the 62nd minute. Marcos de la Espada reduced the margin for East Bengal in the 72nd minute, however, they could find an equaliser with Juan Mera's shot hitting the crossbar was the closest East Bengal got.

On 21 January, just 2 days after the Kolkata Derby defeat, East Bengal FC announced that coach Alejandro Menendez had resigned from his position due to personal reasons and taking responsibility if the poor performance of the team. The new coach will be announced within a few days.

On 22 January, the East Bengal FC management announced a double signing: Liberian striker Ansumana Kromah and Monotosh Chakladar for the remainder of the season.

Mario Rivera Campesino was appointed the new head coach on 23 January, a few hours later Alejandro Menendez left the city. Mario worked with the club in the previous season as the assistant coach and video analyst.

East Bengal FC faced defending champions Chennai City F.C. on 25 January at Coimbatore and finally came back to winning ways with a 2–0 win courtesy of a goal each from Marcos de la Espada and Jaime Santos Colado who scored from the spot. This was the first clean sheet the Red and Gold Brigade achieved in the 2019-20 I-League campaign.

February

East Bengal FC faced Indian Arrows on 1 February at the Kalyani Stadium in the next match and lost by 1–0, courtesy of a solitary goal by Vikram Pratap Singh in the 58th minute.

East Bengal FC played Aizawl F.C. next on 7 February at the Kalyani Stadium and lost once again by a solitary goal from Matias Veron in the 76th minute. This was their 5th defeat in 6 matches in the 2019-20 I-League campaign.

On 12 February, East Bengal FC announced the signing of Spanish defensive midfielder Víctor Pérez Alonso for the remainder of the season.

East Bengal FC faced Punjab F.C. next on 13 February at the Kalyani Stadium and in an intensely fought game managed to share points after the game ended in a 1–1 draw. Ansumana Kromah gave the lead for the Red and Gold brigade in the 9th minute with a long-range effort while Girik Khosla equalised for the visiting team in the 42nd minute to share the points.

East Bengal FC faced Indian Arrows next on 17 February at the Cooperage Ground in Mumbai and got back to winning ways with a 3–1 win courtesy of goals from Jaime Santos Colado in the 6th minute, Asheer Akhtar in the 62nd minute and Lalrindika Ralte in the 67th minute. Vikram Pratap Singh did equalize for the home team in the 54th minute before Asheer and Didika struck the two goals and secure the win.

East Bengal FC travelled to Imphal to face TRAU F.C. next on 23 January at the Khuman Lampak Main Stadium and won their second game in succession after a brilliant second half display to rally from behind to win 4–2. Princewell Emeka scored the opener for the home side in the 18th minute. East Bengal FC scored 4 goals in the second half courtesy of 4 different scorers: Jaime Santos Colado, Kassim Aidara, Brandon Vanlalremdika and Marcos de la Espada. Oguchi Uche reduced the margin for the home side in the 86th minute.

East Bengal FC faced Churchill Brothers S.C. next on 29 February at the Salt Lake Stadium and in a fiercely competitive match managed to share points with a dying minute equalizer goal from Jaime Santos Colado to make it 1-1. Willis Plaza scored the opening goal of the match in the 10th minute for Churchill Brothers.

March

East Bengal FC travelled to Kozhikode next to face Gokulam Kerala F.C. next on 3 March and drew 1-1 plying more than 35 mins against 10-men Gokulam Kerala FC side. Marcus Joseph opened the scoring in the 9th minute for the home side while Víctor Pérez Alonso equalised from the spot after Juan Mera was brought down in the  24th minute. Naocha Huidrom Singh was shown marching orders in the 49th minute for his second booking. Juan Mera and Victor Perez both struck the bar in the second half but could not find the winning goal as both teams shared the points.

East Bengal FC signed back Costa Rican World Cup star and former defender Jhonny Acosta ahead of the game against Real Kashmir FC and released Liberian striker Ansumana Kromah to make way for him.

East Bengal FC continued their travel to Srinagar next as they faced Real Kashmir F.C. on 9 March at the TRC Turf Ground and won by a solitary penalty goal in the dying minutes of the injury time by Víctor Pérez Alonso to snatch all 3 points and move up to the 2nd place in the league table. The game was ill-tempered and Real Kashmir FC had 3 players sent-off in the match while Edmund Lalrindika of Quess East Bengal FC was also given marching orders in the last seconds of the game which means he will miss the all-important Kolkata Derby next.

East Bengal FC was supposed to face arch-rivals Mohun Bagan in the second leg of the Kolkata Derby next on 15 March at the Salt Lake Stadium however due to the outbreak of COVID-19, all matches of the 2019-20 I-League has been suspended till 14 April until further notice. The revised schedule will be announced later.

April

On 18 April, due to the COVID-19 pandemic, the All India Football Federation announced that the remaining matches of 2019-20 I-League will be cancelled and Mohun Bagan was awarded as the champions. No team was relegated, and the remaining prize money (apart from the champion's prize money) was equally divided among the 10 teams.

On 26 April, East Bengal FC's prime investors Quess Corp announced they will be parting ways with the club after 30 April, owing to the COVID-19 pandemic, applying the "Force Majeure Clause".

Competitions

Overall

Overview

Calcutta Football League

Calcutta Football League fixtures were announced on 22 July 2019. East Bengal FC were supposed to start their campaign against George Telegraph S.C. on 31 July at the East Bengal Ground however fixtures were rescheduled due to unavailability of the stadiums and the first game was postponed to 9 August.

Results by round

Matches

Durand Cup

On 8 July the fixtures were announced. East Bengal FC has been slotted into Group "A", along with Army Red, Jamshedpur FC and Bengaluru FC. One team from each of the 4 groups to go through to the Semi-Finals.

East Bengal FC topped the group stages winning all the matches however crashed out in the Semi-Final in the Penalty Shootout after the game ended 1–1 after 120 minutes against Gokulam Kerala F.C., who went on to win the 2019 Durand Cup defeating Mohun Bagan 2–1 in the final.

Group stage

Matches

Knockouts

Matches

Pre-Season Matches

In preparation for the 2019-20 I-League, East Bengal FC have decided to play a set of pre-season friendly matches against ISL opponents. The first match was against 2018-19 Indian Super League Champions Bengaluru FC, on 6 November in Bengaluru. East Bengal FC played NorthEast United FC in their second pre-season friendly match on 16 November at Guwahati. East Bengal FC played their final friendly against Jamshedpur FC on 21 November at Jamshedpur.

Matches

I-League

Result summary

Results by round

Matches

Statistics

Appearances

Players with no appearances not included in the list.

Goal Scorers

Clean Sheets

Disciplinary Record

Honours

Individual Awards

I-League Coach of the Month

See also
 2019–20 in Indian football
 2019–20 Calcutta Premier Division
 Super Cup
 List of East Bengal F.C. managers
 List of Foreign Players for East Bengal FC

Notes

References

East Bengal Club seasons
East Bengal